Desulfatibacillum alkenivorans  is an alkene-degrading, sulfate-reducing, Gram-negative, non-spore-forming and non-motile bacterium from the genus of Desulfatibacillum which has been isolated from oil polluted sediments in France.

See also
 Desulfatibacillum alkenivorans AK-01

References

External links
 Desulfatibacillum_alkenivorans – MicrobeWiki
Type strain of Desulfatibacillum alkenivorans at BacDive -  the Bacterial Diversity Metadatabase

Desulfobacterales
Bacteria described in 2004